Ninh Hải is a ward of Ninh Hòa, Khánh Hòa Province, Vietnam, which was established in 2010.
Ninh Hải has a savanna climate. The average temperature is 26°C (79°F), with July being the hottest month and January the coldest. The average rainfall is 1,762 mm (69.4 in) per year, the rainiest months being September through November.

The ward is the location of the famous  beach.

References

Populated coastal places in Vietnam
Populated places in Khánh Hòa province